St. George's Football Club, is a Maltese football club from the city of Cospicua in the Mediterranean island of Malta, believed to be the oldest club on the island. They are currently playing in the Maltese National Amateur League, and is popularly claimed to be the pioneers of Maltese civilian football.

History 
During the 1880s, a group of Maltese youngsters was watching English soldiers playing football at the Verdala Barracks; an officer gave the young Maltese a ball and that was the start of the game on the island. They formed the first football club in Malta and named it Santa Margherita; two other clubs emerged soon after: St. Andrews and St. George's. The three clubs in Cospicua merged in 1890 to form one club, holding on to the St. George's name.

During the first years of the 20th century, they became Civilian Champions. The best season for the Cospicua team was 1916–17 during which St. George's F.C. won the 'double' by being crowned League champions and Knock Out Cousis Shield winners. One of the most notable players of St. George's was Emmanuel Balolu Busuttil, the only player to captain the St. George's side to their only championship in the 1916–17 season. One of the most notable matches St. Georges played in their history was the 1965–66 the old second division decider against Qormi at the old Mannuel Island, a match that saw the biggest crowd of that season in all the MFA competitions. The match ended with a 2–1 score line in favour of St. Georges. From the corner flag, Zambula kicked the ball without anybody touching it straight into the nearest upright.

Achievements 
Maltese Premier League Winners
1916–17
Maltese Premier League Runners-up
1913–14, 1917–18, 1929–30, 1939–40
Maltese FA Trophy Finalists
1936–37, 1949–50
Cousis Shield
1916–17, 1926–27
Maltese First Division Champions
1991–92, 2005–06
Division 2 Champions
1953–54, 1956–57, 1958–59, 1965–66, 1971–72, 1973–74
Division 2 Knock-Out Winners
1958–59, 1971–72, 1973––74
Division 2 Knock-Out Finalists
1953–54
Maltese Second Division Champions
1987–88, 1996–97, 2003–04
Second & Third Division Knock-Out Winners
1987–88
Second & Third Division Knock-Out Finalists
1999–2000
Maltese Third Division Champions
2002-02
Division 2 Sons of Malta Cup Winners
1971–72, 1973–74
Christmas Cup Winners
1939–40

Current squad

See also
Club of Pioneers

References

External links 
 

 
Football clubs in Malta
Association football clubs established in 1890
1890 establishments in Malta